State Highway 222 (SH 222) is a state highway in north-central Texas. It runs  between U.S. Highway 82/State Highway 114 (US 82/SH 114) and US 380. SH 222 was established in 1935 as a renumbering of SH 126.

History

The route was originally designated by 1928 between Knox City and Munday as SH 126. On March 19, 1930, SH 126 was removed from the state highway list, but was still designated. On August 27, 1935, SH 126, which was not on the State Highway List, was upgraded to a state highway, and renumbered to SH 222. On September 26, 1939, SH 222 was extended north to US 82, replacing SH 252. The section north of Munday was transferred to FM 267 on January 7, 1948. On September 25, 1973, an extension of SH 222 was signed, but not designated along FM 143, FM 1587, part of FM 266, and part of FM 1720. On August 29, 1990, the extension of SH 222 was officially designated, replacing FM 143, FM 1587, part of FM 266, and part of FM 1720.

Junction list

References

External links

222
Transportation in King County, Texas
Transportation in Knox County, Texas
Transportation in Haskell County, Texas
Transportation in Throckmorton County, Texas